Bearwood Lakes Golf Club is a golf club, located in Sindlesham, Berkshire, England. It was established in 1996.

In 2019, a new purpose-built all-weather practice facility was inaugurated.

Rankings 
 In 2018, the club was included in the list of 10 most exclusive golf clubs in the United Kingdom by Golf Monthly.

References

Golf clubs and courses in Berkshire
1996 establishments in England